Nelson Khumbeni (born 14 October 2002) is an English footballer who plays as a midfielder for League One side Bolton Wanderers.

Career
Khumbeni came through the Norwich City Academy, joining at U9 level. He signed his first professional contract with Norwich City on 7 July 2021, penning a one-year deal. Upon the expiration of his deal, he joined Bolton Wanderers on 16 June 2022, linking up with the newly formed 'B' team.

Khumbeni made his Bolton debut on 9 August 2022 in a 5–1 victory against Salford City in the EFL Cup, coming on in the 83rd minute as a substitute for MJ Williams.

Career statistics

References

Living people
2003 births
Association football defenders
English footballers
English Football League players
Norwich City F.C. players
Bolton Wanderers F.C. players